Florian Raspentino (born 6 June 1989) is a French professional footballer who plays as a forward for Championnat National 2 club GOAL FC.

Personal life
Raspentino was born on 6 June 1989, in Marignane to a French mother and an Algerian father, from Algiers. Raspentino is the family name of his maternal grandmother.

Club career

Early career
Raspentino spent the majority of his youth career with AS Gignac, with a brief six-month spell at Ajaccio.

In 2008, he joined Championnat de France Amateur side Marignane, where he spent the next two seasons. In 2010, he joined another CFA side, Agde, scoring 17 goals in 33 games in his first season at the club.

Nantes, Marseille, and loans
On 11 June 2011, Raspentino signed his first professional contract with Nantes.

After a successful season at the Ligue 2 club, on 6 July 2012, Raspentino agreed on a four-year contract with Ligue 1 club Marseille. On 9 January 2012 was sent on loan for the rest of the 2012–2013 season to Brest.

Caen and Dijon 
After spending the 2013–14 season on loan with Bastia, Raspentino signed a three-year contract with promoted team Caen. A few months later, he was loaned to Ligue 2 team Dijon.

Return to Bastia
On 31 August 2015, Raspentino returned to his old club Bastia signing on a one-year deal, with an option of a second year. He scored his first goal of the season on 2 December 2015, helping his side to 1–0 victory over Bordeaux. Raspentino left the club in the summer of 2017 when his contract had ended.

Eupen
In December 2017, free agent Raspentino signed for Belgian First Division A club Eupen and immediately started in the away match against Anderlecht. On 31 August 2018, the last day of the 2018 summer transfer window, he agreed the termination of his contract with Eupen.

Grenoble and third Bastia spell 
Ahead of the 2019–20 season Raspentino joined Ligue 2 side Grenoble on a two-year contract. After a disappointing first season which was cut short by the COVID-19 pandemic he agreed to terminate his contract.

On 22 September 2020, Bastia announced that Raspentino had signed for a third spell with the newly promoted Championnat National club, agreeing a one-year contract.

Bastia-Borgo
On 25 August 2021, Raspentino joined Bastia-Borgo.

GOAL FC
Raspentino moved to Championnat National 2 side GOAL FC in August 2022.

International career
In late 2011 Raspentino was contacted by Nourredine Kourichi, assistant manager of the Algeria national team, to gauge his interest in representing Algeria. Raspentino responded saying he would not refuse a call-up but would prefer to settle at Marseille first.

Career statistics

References

External links
 
 

1989 births
Living people
Sportspeople from Bouches-du-Rhône
Association football forwards
French footballers
French sportspeople of Algerian descent
FC Nantes players
Olympique de Marseille players
Marignane Gignac Côte Bleue FC players
Stade Brestois 29 players
SC Bastia players
Stade Malherbe Caen players
Dijon FCO players
K.A.S. Eupen players
Valenciennes FC players
Grenoble Foot 38 players
FC Bastia-Borgo players
GOAL FC players
Ligue 1 players
Ligue 2 players
Championnat National players
Championnat National 2 players
Belgian Pro League players
French expatriate footballers
French expatriate sportspeople in Belgium
Expatriate footballers in Belgium
Footballers from Provence-Alpes-Côte d'Azur